Dinas Powys F.C. is a Welsh football club that plays in the Ardal Leagues South West, which is tier 3 of the Welsh football pyramid. They are based in Dinas Powys, near Cardiff, in South Wales. They have an academy with over 100 players.

Current squad

Staff 
Club Manager:  
Assistant Manager: Nathan Nurton

1st Team Coach:

References

External links
Go to DPFC Website
Pitchhero page

 

Football clubs in Wales
football
Welsh Football League clubs
Ardal Leagues clubs
1951 establishments in Wales
Association football clubs established in 1951